Boll & Branch is a privately held, U.S. based, e-commerce company that sells luxury bedding online. Headquartered in Summit, New Jersey, the company manufactures and sells organic cotton bed linens, blankets and bath towels and are the first maker of such goods to be certified by Fair Trade USA.

Boll & Branch launched in January 2014 by a former third grade teacher, Missy Tannen and her husband, a former Wrigley and Kraft Foods exec, Scott Tannen, who self-funded the venture. Most of the company's products are manufactured in Kolkata, India with the cotton being grown by CHETNA Organic in Orissa, India.

The company's annual revenue is estimated to be in excess of $100 Million.

In August 2017, they announced the opening of its first brick & mortar retail location in The Mall at Short Hills in Short Hills, New Jersey In October 2019, Nordstrom announced that it will make Boll & Branch products available in 21 of their stores. This will be the first time the Company's products are available through a third-party retailer. The Company was among the first retailers to utilize Far-UVC 222 lighting to sanitize their stores in the Town Center at Boca Raton and in Greenwich, CT.

Products 
Boll & Branch has received notice for its  ethical and sustainable manufacturing of luxury bed sheets. In August 2015, it launched a line of organic cotton bath towels and introduced a line of crib sheets and blankets for babies in October 2015.

In October 2016, the Company launched a line of flannel bedding made in Guimaraes, Portugal. In June 2018, it introduced a line of ethically sourced Down pillows.

In October 2018, it expanded into the mattress industry. They promote their "luxury mattress" as not containing memory foam, but rather using wool, coils and organic cotton.

Investments 
Boll & Branch received $7 million Series A funding from Silas Capital in April 2016 and raised a $4 million Series B investment in October 2017 also from Silas Capital.

In August 2019, the company received a $100 Million investment from private-equity firm, L Catterton. With this investment, Founder Scott Tannen will continue in his role as CEO.

References

External links
 

2013 establishments in New Jersey
Mattress retailers of the United States
Fair trade brands
Companies based in Union County, New Jersey
American companies established in 2013
Summit, New Jersey